Robert Petre may refer to:

 Robert Petre (jockey) (1912–1996), English National Hunt racing jockey, during the 1930s and 1940s
 Robert Petre (footballer) (born 1997), Romanian footballer
Robert Petre (died 1593), Puritan and MP for Fowey, Penry and Dartmouth
 Robert Petre, 3rd Baron Petre (1599–1638)
 Robert Petre, 7th Baron Petre (1689–1713)
 Robert Petre, 8th Baron Petre (1713–1742), horticulturist
 Robert Petre, 9th Baron Petre (1742–1801)
 Robert Petre, 10th Baron Petre (1763–1809)

See also
Robert Peter, American politician